

Group B

Game 1

Game 2

Game 3

Game 4

Game 5

Game 6

Game 7

Game 8

Game 9

Game 10

2006–07 ULEB Cup